As Rapture Comes is the seventh studio album by Swedish death metal band Grave. It was released on July 25, 2006 through Century Media Records.

Track listing

Personnel
Grave
Fredrik Isaksson - Bass
Jonas Torndal - Guitars
Pelle Ekegren - Drums
Ola Lindgren - Vocals, Guitars

Production
Peter Tägtgren - Engineering (vocals), Mixing
Jacek Wiśniewski - Cover art, Artwork (background pieces)
Stefan Wibbeke - Layout, Design
Olle Carlsson - Photography (band)
Henrik Jonsson - Mastering
Ola Lindgren - Engineering, Mixing, Producer, Lyrics
Peter Othberg - Engineering, Producer

References 

2006 albums
Grave (band) albums
Century Media Records albums